The 1989 Nabisco Dinah Shore was a women's professional golf tournament, held March 30 to April 2 at Mission Hills Country Club in Rancho Mirage, California. This was the 18th edition of the Nabisco Dinah Shore, and the seventh as a major championship.

Juli Inkster won the second of her two Dinah Shores, five strokes ahead of runners-up JoAnne Carner and  She led wire-to-wire and entered the final round with a five-stroke lead. It was the third of Inkster's seven major titles, although the fourth came over a decade later.

Past champions in the field

Made the cut

Missed the cut

Final leaderboard
Sunday, April 2, 1989

References

External links
Golf Observer leaderboard

Chevron Championship
Golf in California
Nabisco Dinah Shore
Nabisco Dinah Shore
Nabisco Dinah Shore
Nabisco Dinah Shore
Nabisco Dinah Shore
Women's sports in California